Gabriel Cohen (born April 10, 1991) is an Israeli footballer.

External links
 

1991 births
Living people
Israeli footballers
Maccabi Ironi Kiryat Ata F.C. players
Hapoel Hadera F.C. players
Maccabi Netanya F.C. players
Maccabi Tzur Shalom F.C. players
Maccabi Sektzia Ma'alot Tarshiha F.C. players
Beitar Nahariya F.C. players
Ironi Tiberias F.C. players
Hapoel Beit She'an F.C. players
Hapoel Shefa-'Amr F.C. players
Hapoel Kfar Shalem F.C. players
Hapoel Iksal F.C. players
Israeli Premier League players
Liga Leumit players
Footballers from Haifa
Association football goalkeepers